Danie Visser and Laurie Warder were the defending champions, but they did not compete together this year. Visser participated alongside Jim Grabb and was defeated in the first round by Sergio Casal and Emilio Sánchez, while Warder participated alongside Brett Steven and was defeated also in the first round by Goran Ivanišević and Marc Rosset.

Jacco Eltingh and Paul Haarhuis ended up winning the title, defeating Byron Black and Jonathan Stark in the final. This was the first final and Grand Slam victory for the Dutch pair, who would go on to complete a Career Grand Slam.

Seeds

Draw

Finals

Top half

Section 1

Section 2

Bottom half

Section 3

Section 4

External links
 1994 Australian Open – Men's draws and results at the International Tennis Federation

Men's Doubles
1994